El Carrizo is town located in Nuevo Laredo Municipality in the Mexican state of Tamaulipas. According to the INEGI Census of 2010, Miguel Alemán had a population of 114 inhabitants.  Its elevation is 136 meters above sea level.

References 

Populated places in Tamaulipas
Nuevo Laredo